Nicol Zelikman (born January 30, 2001) is a former Israeli individual rhythmic gymnast.  She is a two-time medalist at the 2016 European Junior Championships.

Early life
Zelikman was born and raised in Kfar Saba, Israel. Her grandparents, father, and mother were born in Baku, Soviet Azerbaijan. They had lived there, met and married; and in 1993 they moved to Russia, and then immigrated to Israel. She has a twin brother and two older brothers.

She was introduced to rhythmic gymnastics by her mother; Elena "Lena" Zelikman, who is also her personal assistant coach.
In 2019, Zelikman was enlisted to the Israel Defense Forces, but also continued practicing professionally. Her head coach is Ella Samofalov.

Career

Junior 
Zelikman began appearing in international junior competitions in 2012; at the Miss Valentine and Vitry Cup. She has competed in numerous competitions since 2014 at the Junior Grand Prix and World Cup series. In 2015, Zelikman competed at the Yoldyz Cup in Kazan. Zelikman finished 4th in team and won silver in hoop, bronze in ball at the 2016 Moscow Junior Grand Prix. She won silver in ball and 4th in rope at the 2016 Lisboa Junior World Cup. Zelikman competed at the 2016 European Junior Championships where Israel finished 4th in Team event, she qualified in 2 apparatus finals where she won silver in hoop and bronze in ball.

Senior 
In 2017 season Zelikman made her senior debut at the Moscow International tournament where she won the all-around bronze medal. On March 24–26, Zelikamn competed at the Thiais Grand Prix finishing 7th in the all-around, she qualified to 3 event finals placing 5th in ribbon and 6th in hoop, clubs. On March 31 - April 2, Zelikman competed at the 2017 Grand Prix Marbella finishing 5th in the all-around and qualified to all the apparatus finals. On April 7–9, Zelikman competed in her first World Cup event at the 2017 Pesaro World Cup finishing 10th in the all-around and qualified in the Clubs final finishing in 4th place. Her next competition was at the 2017 Baku World Cup where she finished 8th in the all-around and qualified in the hoop final. On May 5–7, Zelikman competed at the 2017 Sofia World Cup finishing 6th in the all-around behind Katsiaryna Halkina of Belarus, she qualified in 2 apparatus finals and finished 5th in clubs and 6th in ribbon. Zelikman suffered an arm injury where she broke 2 bones which will require a surgery, thus she was not selected to compete at the European Championships.

In 2018, Zelikman returned to competition at the 2018 Grand Prix Thiais finishing 6th in the all-around behind Arina Averina, she qualified in 3 apparatus finals taking silver in ball, finished 4th in ribbon and 5th in clubs. On April 6–8, she won the gold medal in the all-around at the MTM Ljubljana tournament. On April 20–22, at the 2018 Tashkent World Cup, Zelikman finished 5th in the all-around, she qualified in all the apparatus finals: finishing 4th in ball, clubs and 7th in hoop, ribbon. On May 4–6, she then competed at the 2018 Guadalajara World Challenge Cup finishing 11th in the all-around, she qualified into the ball final where she won her first world cup medal, a bronze behind Italian Milena Baldassarri. On May 11–13, Zelikman continued her success at the 2018 Portimao World Challenge Cup, where she won silver in the all-around behind Russia's Maria Sergeeva, she qualified in all apparatus finals and won gold in ball, silver in hoop, bronze in clubs and finished 7th in ribbon.

In 2019, during the European Championships which were held in Baku, Zelikman has won the bronze medal in hoop.

In 2021, Zelikman competed in the Baku World Cup, where she came in twenty-sixth place behind Chisaki Oiwa and seventh in the ball final. At the Pesaro World Cup, she came in sixth place behind Anastasia Salos and in the finals she was seventh in the hoop and fifth in ball. From June 9–13, she competed in the 2021 European Rhythmic Gymnastics Championships in Varna, Bulgaria, where she placed ninth in the individual overall final behind Sofía Raffaeli. In the apparatus finals, she placed eighth in ribbon and fifth in ball. The Israeli team also won the bronze medal which was represented by herself, Linoy Ashram and the Israeli group gymnasts. At the beginning of July, she returned to the Minsk Challenge World Cup, where she came in fifth place overall behind Daría Trubnikova. She also placed fifth in the hoop and ball and ribbon finals, and won bronze in clubs. Two weeks later, she participated in the Tel Aviv Grand Prix, in her home country - the last competition before the Tokyo Olympic Games. She finished fourth behind Anastasia Salos. She also gained fourth place in the hoop final, sixth in the ball and ribbon finals, and fifth in the club final. From August 6–8, Zelikman and her teammate, Linoy Ashram, competed in the individual competition of the Tokyo 2020 Olympic Games. Having made the top ten, both Zelikman (who finished seventh in qualifications) and Ashram (who finished third) advanced to the individual overall final. In the individual overall competition, Zelikman repeated the seventh place behind Milena Baldassarri. Ashram won the gold medal becoming the first athlete from a non-former Soviet country to do so at an Olympics. Following the Games, the Israeli Gymnastics Federation announced  Zelikman has retired as an individual gymnast and will instead move to competing as a group rhythmic gymnast in the Israeli team.

In early 2022, she announced her retirement from competitive sport.

Routine music information

Detailed Olympic results

See also
 Sports in Israel
 Linoy Ashram

References

External links
 
 
 
 
 
 

Israeli rhythmic gymnasts
2001 births
Living people
People from Kfar Saba
Olympic gymnasts of Israel
Gymnasts at the 2020 Summer Olympics
Israeli people of Azerbaijani descent
Israeli people of Soviet descent